Amanda Melby is an American actress and film producer. She is the host of the Emmy-winning series Screen Wars, and the star and producer of the film Raising Buchanan.

Career
After graduation from Concordia College in Moorhead, MN, Melby began her acting career with stops in Los Angeles, San Diego, Cleveland, and Washington, DC, working in commercials, theatre, studio films (The Majestic), independent films (Locker 13, Jake's Corner, Netherbeast Incorporated, Madison Hall), and television (Candid Camera, S.I.S., Boston Public, Young & the Restless).

Settling in Arizona, Melby served as the Executive Director of the Phoenix chapter of Independent Feature Project (IFP/PHX) from 2005-2011, building a network for Arizona’s independent filmmakers. From 2006- 2012, she was a board member of the Phoenix Film Foundation and the Arizona Film and Media Coalition (AFMC).  She was the Secretary of the SAG-AFTRA Arizona-Utah Board, having served on the separate unions’ boards prior to the merger from 2005-2013.

In 2005, Melby was one of the creators of Screen Wars, an Arizona-based television series showcasing independent film. She hosted and produced 69 episodes over two seasons. The series was nominated for 13 Rocky Mountain Emmy Awards, winning four. Melby was personally nominated for three of these Emmys (for hosting and producing).

Melby was honored with the 2007 Phoenix Film Foundation Board Member of the Year, and with the 2008 Layne Award presented by the Arizona Entertainment Alliance. She was also nominated for the 2011 Arizona Governor’s Arts Award for her contributions to the Arizona Entertainment Community.

In 2019, Melby produced and starred in Raising Buchanan, a feature film co-starring René Auberjonois, M. Emmet Walsh, Cathy Shim, Terence Bernie Hines, and Robert Ben Garant. Melby garnered accolades and awards (for her role as producer and her lead performance) from a variety of film festivals in the United States and abroad.

Selected filmography

Actress

Producer

Personal life
Melby is a faculty associate at Arizona State University teaching screen acting and is the head coach and owner of Verve Studios, a professional actor-training studio in Scottsdale, Arizona. She is married with two children.

References

External links
 

Actresses from Minnesota
American film actresses
American television actresses
21st-century American actresses
Actresses from Arizona
American women film producers
People from St. Cloud, Minnesota
Year of birth missing (living people)
Living people